The Thattekkad Bird Sanctuary, covering an area of barely 25 km2, and located about 12 km from Kothamangalam (Kerala state, India), was the first bird sanctuary in Kerala. Salim Ali, one of the best known ornithologists, described this sanctuary as the richest bird habitat on peninsular India. Thattekkad literally means flat forest, and the region is a deciduous but generally moist low-land forest surrounding the Periyar River, the longest river in Kerala.

Species
The Thattekkad Bird Sanctuary has a rich and varied birdlife. Several species of birds, both forest birds as well as water birds, visit the sanctuaries; notable ones include the following:

The Indian pitta, which visits the sanctuary during winter and spends almost six months here.
Orange-headed thrush
Large-billed leaf-warbler
Jerdon's nightjar
Indian cuckoo
Oriental darter
Cormorants
Whiskered terns
Collared scops owl
Ceylon frogmouth
Grey-fronted green pigeon
Yellow-browed bulbuls

The sanctuary is a habitat for different varieties of cuckoos and a region of the sanctuary popularly called "Cuckoo Paradise" is home to them, among which are the:
Drongo cuckoo, which may be easily mistaken for drongo,
Indian hawk cuckoo, which is highly vocal, and the
Large hawk cuckoo, which looks relatively massive compared to other types of cuckoos, and is characterized by a dark grey and heavily streaked throat.

The Idamalayar forest is located about 15 km from Thattekkad Bird Sanctuary. There is a large evergreen forest to the east and south-east of the Idamalayar Dam, extending from Malakkappara to as far as Rajamala. The mountain hawk eagles are found in this forest. Other birds in this forest include dark-fronted babbler, brown-cheeked fulvetta, brown-backed and white-rumped needletails, and emerald green pigeons.

See also
 Sailana Kharmour Bird Sanctuary
 Salim Ali Bird Sanctuary

Gallery

Notes

References

External links 
 Things to Know before Travelling Thattekad
 Thattekad Sanctuary Entry fees and Timings
 Thattekad Butterfly park
 Thattekad Bird List

Bird sanctuaries of Kerala
Tourist attractions in Ernakulam district
Protected areas established in 1983
1983 establishments in Kerala
Geography of Ernakulam district